Jean-Paul Cluzel (born 29 January 1947) is a French government official and politician. Among other positions, he has served as Inspector General of Finance, director of the Paris Opera, and CEO of Radio France Internationale and Radio France. He is currently the president of the entity in charge of the administration of the Grand Palais and the president of the "Réunion des musées nationaux", an entity which administers 34 national museums under the authority of the French Ministry of Culture. He is also openly gay, advocates for LGBT rights, and supports AIDS-related campaigns.

Early life

Cluzel was born on January 29, 1947, and lived in Le Kremlin-Bicêtre, a suburb of Paris, France, until he was 14. His parents worked in a hardware store. He studied in the École nationale d'administration from 1970 until 1972, the Institut d'Études Politiques de Paris, Panthéon-Assas University, and the University of Chicago, where he received a Master of Arts.

References

1947 births
Living people
French civil servants
French LGBT politicians
French LGBT rights activists
Sciences Po alumni
Paris 2 Panthéon-Assas University alumni
Commandeurs of the Légion d'honneur
Officers Crosses of the Order of Merit of the Federal Republic of Germany
Officers of the Ordre national du Mérite
Directors of the Paris Opera
Gay politicians